The Journal of Theoretical and Philosophical Psychology is a peer-reviewed academic journal published by the American Psychological Association on behalf of APA Division 24 (Society for Theoretical and Philosophical Psychology). The journal was established in 1986 and "is devoted to fostering discussion at the interface of psychology, philosophy, and metatheory". The current editor-in-chief is Brent D. Slife.

Abstracting and indexing 
The journal is abstracted and indexed in Scopus.

References

External links 
 

American Psychological Association academic journals
English-language journals
Works about philosophy of psychology
Philosophy of mind journals